Markuszów  is a village in Puławy County, Lublin Voivodeship, in eastern Poland. The first written mention of Markuszów dates from the year 1317. It is the seat of the gmina (administrative district) called Gmina Markuszów.

The current village population is reported to be around 1,300 residents.

History
Before the Holocaust, the Jewish population numbered 2,000.  In April 1942 about 500 Jews, mainly the elderly and the ill, were deported to the death camp in Sobibór. The deported were replaced by a large group of displaced Jewish refugees from Slovakia. A group of Jewish partisans from Markuszów operated in the forests for some time, but most of them were captured and executed. On May 9, 1942, the remaining Jews from the ghetto were deported to the gas chambers at Sobibór. The Jewish community ceased to exist.

Education
A kindergarten (pre-school), primary-school, and gymnasium (middle school) are located in Markuszów and serve students within the gmina. The primary-school and gymnasium are housed in the same building. The primary school is named after Jan Pocek, a folk poet from neighboring village of Zabłocie, and serves approximately 150 students. Around 70 students attend the gymnasium.

Afterwards, students must commute to, or move to, a larger city like Lublin or Puławy to continue studies in a liceum or technicum.

Transport
Very busy national roads DK17 (Warsaw - Hrebenne), DK12 (Łęknica - Dorohusk), and E372 pass jointly through the heart of Markuszów. Construction of joint expressway S17 and S12 is ongoing with completion projected later this year (2013). The new expressway route is constructed through cow pastures and farms to the North. Upon completion, most of Lublin-Warsaw traffic will bypass the village completely.

References

External links 
Municipal website of Markuszów (Polish)
Information about the pre-1939 Jewish community in Markuszów (Polish)

Villages in Puławy County